漢字 may refer to:

Chinese characters, logograms used in writing Chinese, Cantonese, Japanese, Korean sometimes, and Vietnamese formerly
By extension, the Chinese family of scripts
Kanji, the Chinese characters used in modern written Japanese
Hanja, the Chinese characters sometimes used in modern written Korean
Hán tự, the Chinese characters formerly used in written Vietnamese
Honzi, the Chinese characters used in written Cantonese, including some characters that are not used in writing Standard Chinese